The Great Western Railway 1000 Class or County Class was a class of 4-6-0 steam locomotive. Thirty examples were built between 1945 and 1947, but all were withdrawn and scrapped in the early 1960s. A replica locomotive is under construction.

Background
These locomotives were the final and most powerful development of the two-cylinder Saint Class introduced in 1901 and included several features that had already been used on the successful Modified Hall class.

The Chief Mechanical Engineer of the GWR  Frederick W. Hawksworth had hoped to design a new 4-6-2 (Pacific) express locomotive for post war traffic, when he took up office in 1941 but had been prevented by the war from doing so. This scheme was not entirely dead in 1945 when he was given the authority to build another batch of mixed-traffic 4-6-0s. Rather than build more examples of existing designs, Hawksworth introduced the County Class as a testbed for a number of the ideas he hoped to incorporate into the Pacific at a later date. Hawksworth was not subsequently allowed to build his Pacific, as there was no need for further express passenger locomotives.

Design
In addition to the innovations already adopted for the Modified Hall class, the new class contained several further changes from usual Great Western practice including the use of double chimneys on certain members and a high boiler pressure of 280psi (although this was later lowered in an attempt to reduce maintenance costs). The boiler was a development that used the tooling for the LMS Stanier Class 8F boiler, Hawksworth being able to study this design closely when 8Fs were being built at Swindon as part of the war effort.
The class had continuous splashers over the driving wheels and, when named, straight nameplates, making them immediately recognisable from other 4-6-0 classes. They were also fitted with Hawksworth's  slab-sided tenders, but the County tenders had a water tank six inches wider than the tenders built for the Modified Halls and retro-fitted to many earlier designs.

Some of the early design studies for what became the County included outside Walschaerts valve gear which would have been a major break from traditional GWR designs. In the event the standard inside Stephenson link motion of the Churchward and Collett two cylinder classes was used. The GWR 1500 Class, also designed by Hawksworth, used outside Walschaerts as did the steam railcar units designed under Churchward and the narrow gauge Vale of Rheidol 2-6-2T.

Production
The first batch of twenty were built at Swindon Works and delivered between August 1945 and March 1946 (Lot No. 354). They were originally unnamed and were planned to be numbered in the 9900 series, but this was changed to 1000-1019 before introduction. A second batch of ten further locomotives (1020-1029) were built between April 1946 and April 1947 (Swindon Lot 358). The second batch were given names English and Welsh Counties previously used on the GWR 3800 Class of 4-4-0 tender locomotives that were part of George Jackson Churchward's locomotive standardisation programme in the early days of the 20th century.

Operation

The Counties had a mixed reception: some traditionalists regarded them as ‘non-standard, expensive and unnecessary,’ others considered them a successful, free steaming design, well suited to express or freight work and a fitting finale to GW two-cylinder 4-6-0 development. According to O.S. Nock ‘their best and really brilliant work was done north of Wolverhampton where they ran very heavy trains with conspicuous success.’

British Railways
After the nationalisation of Britain's railways in 1948 all 30 Counties continued to do useful work throughout the Western Region of British Railways, working with Castles on expresses to and from Paddington as well as more menial freight and parcels tasks. BR gave the Counties the power classification 6MT. Speedometers were fitted to the class from 1950 and modified double chimneys from 1956.

Withdrawal 
 
Withdrawals of the class took place between September 1962 and November 1964. No. 1011 County of Chester was the last of the class withdrawn. It was placed in storage before being sold to Cashmore's scrapyard in Newport where it was cut up in March 1965. All were scrapped.

Preservation 

No locomotives of this class survived into preservation. However a replica is being built at the Didcot Railway Centre, home of the Great Western Society. When completed it will take the name and number of No. 1014 County of Glamorgan in recognition of the late Dai Woodham's Barry Scrapyard in Glamorganshire from which many withdrawn steam locomotives were saved for preservation. Also Glamorganshire County Council donated the frames and boiler for the project. 
The replica is based around the frames from Modified Hall Class 7927 Willington Hall and the boiler from LMS Stanier 8F 48518. The boiler from the Hall will be used in the replica Grange project at the Llangollen Railway. It will also have a number of smaller original parts off scrapped County locomotives including the chimney from 1006 County of Cornwall.

Models
Hornby Railways manufacture a model of the 10xx in OO gauge. This model was originally made by Dapol.

Stock list

See also 
 List of GWR standard classes with two outside cylinders

Notes

References

External links 

 1000 'County' class
 GWR Class 1000 4-6-0 County
 Details of County to be built at Didcot Railway Centre

1000
4-6-0 locomotives
Railway locomotives introduced in 1945
Scrapped locomotives
Standard gauge steam locomotives of Great Britain
2′C h2 locomotives